Halil İbrahim Turan (born 10 June 1980) is a Turkish boxer. He competed in the men's flyweight event at the 2000 Summer Olympics.

References

1980 births
Living people
Turkish male boxers
Olympic boxers of Turkey
Boxers at the 2000 Summer Olympics
Place of birth missing (living people)
Flyweight boxers